Walton William Cook (May 12, 1933 – April 20, 2008) was a Canadian lawyer and politician. He represented the electoral district of Lunenburg Centre in the Nova Scotia House of Assembly from 1970 to 1974. He was a member of the Nova Scotia Liberal Party.

Cook was born in Bridgewater, Nova Scotia. A lawyer, he attended Dalhousie University for his Bachelor of Laws (L.L.B.) degree. In 1962, he married Judith Isabelle Keddy. He died at home in Lunenburg in 2008.

References

1933 births
2008 deaths
Dalhousie University alumni
Nova Scotia Liberal Party MLAs
People from Bridgewater, Nova Scotia